Okatie (pronounced "OH-kuh-tee") is an unincorporated suburban community west of Hilton Head Island, located in Beaufort and Jasper counties, in the Lowcountry of South Carolina.  Okatie takes its name from the nearby Okatee River, an estuary of the Port Royal Sound.  The headquarters of the Beaufort-Jasper Water and Sewer Authority are located in Okatie, as are the Beaufort-Jasper Academy for Career Excellence and John Paul II Catholic High School.

Okatie is an unincorporated area stretching from southcentral Jasper County to western Beaufort County, between I-95 and SC 462. It was designated a voting precinct on March 1, 1916, by the General Assembly of the State of South Carolina.  Portions of Okatie have been annexed by Bluffton, Hardeeville and Port Royal.  South Carolina Highway 170 (also known as Okatie Highway) is generally considered to be the main route through Okatie.

Okatie has experienced predominantly low-density residential development since the 1990s, including Sun City Hilton Head, Riverbend, and Oldfield.  Additional commercial and low intensity industrial development have also occurred, primarily in the Jasper County sections of Okatie.  This development pattern has resulted in concerns over water quality and loss of forest habitat for wildlife. Previous efforts to incorporate the community have been unsuccessful, due in part to conflicting opinions on the future of growth and development in the area.

References 

Geography of Beaufort County, South Carolina
Geography of Jasper County, South Carolina
Populated places in Beaufort County, South Carolina
Populated places in Jasper County, South Carolina
Hilton Head Island–Beaufort micropolitan area